Kushkan (also Romanized as Kūshkān; also known as Kūshkān-e Bālā) is a village in Golmakan Rural District, Golbajar District, Chenaran County, Razavi Khorasan Province, Iran. At the 2006 census, its population was 76, in 18 families.

References 

Populated places in Chenaran County